Crigglestone is a civil parish in the metropolitan borough of the City of Wakefield, West Yorkshire, England.  The parish contains 20 listed buildings that are recorded in the National Heritage List for England.  Of these, one is listed at Grade II*, the middle of the three grades, and the others are at Grade II, the lowest grade.  The parish is mainly residential, and most of the listed buildings are houses, farmhouses and farm buildings.  The other listed buildings consist of two churches, a former corn mill, and a milestone.


Key

Buildings

References

Citations

Sources

 

Lists of listed buildings in West Yorkshire